Bak Jungyang (Hanja: 朴重陽; May 3, 1874 or 1872 — April 23, 1959) was a Korean Joseon and Japanese-ruled Korean bureaucrat, politician, liberal and social activist. He demolished the castle of Daegueup and the Old Gyungsangdo Provincial Office, and contributed to city planning and road maintenance in Daegu. He also participated in the destruction of the Castle of Jinju. He was a conscientious Japanese colonial supporter with pro-Japanese group ideology as well as an advocate for civil rights.

Bak went abroad to Japan to study and later returned to become a bureaucrat in his country. He was appointed as the Mayor of Daegu and the deputy Governor of Gyeongsangbuk-do from 1906 to 1907. Later, he succeeded sequentially in the positions of Governor of Phyeongannamto, Jeollanam-do, Gyeongsangbuk-do, Phyeonganpukto and Chungcheongnam-do. Bak was involved in the Japan–Korea Treaty of 1910 and opposed the March 1st Movement. He also founded the Refrain Club.

Bak was also Governor of Hwanghae-do from 1921 to 1923 and Chungcheongbuk-do Provinces from 1923 to 1925. Then, in 1928, he was reappointed Governor of Hwanghae-do province.

Bak was pro-Japanese, and was later named a collaborator after World War II. He was nicknamed Haeak, Ilso, and Wongeun.

Early life 
Bak Jungyang was born on May 3, 1874/1872, in Junae in Yangju county, Gyeonggi province or Daegu, son of Bak Jeong-ho and Lady Lee of Jeonju clan. His birth year is unclear, according to one source his birth year is 1872 or 1874. The origin of his family is unknown. His father supervised a rent farm and leased it out as well. He had several brothers and sisters but they died early.

In his adolescence, he joined the Independence Club, but it was dispersed due to the repression of the Korean Empire. This caused Bak to be disappointed and left him with a bad feeling against the Korean Empire.

In March 1894, the Korean Empire employed and dispatched assassins to Japan and China. In Shanghai, China Kim Ok-kyun, a reform minded activist, was murdered by assassin Hong Jong-u. Kim’s body was turned over to a Chinese warship, where it was dismembered. Parts of his body were put on public display in several towns in Korea as a traditional humiliation and punishment for treason. When Hong returned to Korea he was appointed to high office. Bak grew an extreme hatred towards the Korean Empire and the people of Korea.

International study 
From an early age, he wanted to go abroad to Japan. In 1897, he was selected as a Korean state student to study abroad in Japan. Bak supported himself during his studies because his family was poor. From 1897 to 1900, he studied in Aoyama middle school. In 1900, he entered Dokyo buki high school as a banking major. Then, he added a double major in Japanese police studies there. After the graduation, Bak adopted Neo-Confucianism and the 'Theory of the national prosperity and the military power' from Ito Hirobumi.

At the time, he chose the Japanese name Yamamoto Shin. Bak also became a Japanese petty bureaucrat. He tried to introduce the parliamentary system to the Imperial Korean government, but the Korean government refused.

In 1903, he returned and passed the probation period as a civil officer of  Imperial Korea. After returning to Korea, Bak continued to advocate a pro-Japanese position.

Career

Korean Empire era 

In 1903, Bak successfully filled various government posts, and was also appointed as a staff of the Public Administration Agency. In 1905, he served as a military interpreter during the Russo-Japanese War. In November 1905, he was appointed to the staff of the Farming, Commerce and Industry Department. He resigned when the Japan–Korea Treaty of 1905 was signed. On May 5, he was appointed as an engineer of the National Defense Department (군부;軍部) engineer, and accompanied Prince Yi Kang to go to Japan. Two months later, he returned to his country.

In 1906, Bak was promoted to Governor of Daegu County. Then, after a short period, he was promoted again to the Acting Governor of the Gyeongsangbuk-do. During the term, Bak tore down the castle of Daegueup without official permission He secretly hired Japanese workers to tear down the structure. also Bak was lay out a new street. In early 1906, he applied for permission from the Korean government, but it was refused. The government tried to punish him for the action, but he acquired protection from Ito Hirobumi. Later, he modernized the Daegu city planning and road maintenance.

He strove in building modern hospitals, medical schools and colleges, and successfully built the Dojin hospital and its affiliated medical school. He was also a supporter of the free press, including journals which satirized him. His idea was that the freedom of the press is a must to supervise the government.

In 1907, he became a governor of Phyeongannamto and Phyeonganpukto, and in 1910, the Governor of Chungcheongnam-do.

Japanese rule 

When the Japan–Korea Treaty of 1910 was signed in August 1910, Bak remained as the Governor of Chungcheongnam-do until 1915.  From 1916 to 1920, he was a member of Japanese Government-General of Korea's Privy Council. In 1919, he opposed the March 1st Movement, and founded the Refrain club on 6 April in response. Bak was hindrance and dissuade, advice of go home of demonstrato of March 1st Movement. His old friends Seo Jae-pil and Yun Chi-ho cut off relations with him due to this.

He was appointed as the Governor of Hwanghae Province in 1921, and the Governor of North Chungcheong Province in 1923 to 1925. After the 1923 Great Kantō earthquake, he appealed to the Japanese government to release the arrested Koreans, and asserted that the Koreans were not involved in the criminal cases which occurred during the earthquake. In November 1924, he was accused in a sex abuse scandal, but the accuser woman suddenly died; three years later, the charge against him was dismissed. In 1928, he was re-appointed as the Governor of Hwanghae Province.

He governed the civilians through a regulated bureaucracy system, often with warning and several days of confinement instead of punishment, and suppressed the power of the Japanese police and soldiers to harass civilians, even putting them in confinement as well.  Sometimes, the bureaucrats were imprisoned, but the Japanese police never arrested him, because he was especially trusted by the Japanese Governor-General of Korea, which pleased many Joseon people.

World War II era 
 
In 1927 to 1939, he was a member of Japanese Government-General of Korea's Privy Council; and in 1936, the advisor of Japanese Government-General of Korea's Privy Council. Seven years later, he was elected as the vice-chairman of the council. In 1940, he changed name to Hōchū Segeyō as per the Japanese Sōshi-kaimei.

On October 22, 1941, he was appointed as the adviser of the Fight-patriotic of Joseon Group, which merged with the Peoples Mind Alliance in January 1943. During the Asia-Pacific War, he contributed to encourage and comfort the Japanese troops, as in 1942 and 1943, when he was sent to console the Japanese troops stationed in Singapore. In 1943, he was appointed as Vice-Chairman of Japanese Government-General of Korea's Privy Council. On 3 April 1945, he was elected as a congressman in the House of Peers.

Due to his cooperation with the Japanese Empire and the Japanese Governor-General of Korea, he was listed as a Pro-Japanese collaborators in Korea by the Institute for Research in Collaborationist Activities in 2008.

Later years 

Korea was liberated on August 15, 1945, after the end of World War II, but Bak stayed in Daegu. He mocked the Korean independence activists for talking about their heroic deeds in the independence battle.

After October 1945, as some pro-Japanese group begged for their lives, he ridiculed Korean resistance activists. On January 1, 1949, he was arrested by the Special Investigation Committee of Anti-National Activities and charged under the National Traitor Law. But, Bak maintained his innocence at the court and stood by his pro-Japanese beliefs.

In February 1949, he was released on bail due to bronchial pneumonia and asthma. Later, he continued to criticize President Syngman Rhee, Kim Gu, Lee See-yeong and Ham Tae-yeong as "patrioteers". In 1955, Rhee tried to confine Bak to a So-ju-yeong psychiatric hospital and Seoul Seongmo psychiatric hospital, but failed. Bak Jungyang died Chimsan Mountine, in Daegu on April 23, 1959 due to pneumonia. the cause of death is lung disease and Senile disease.

Personal life

Family 
One version says he was an adopted son of Ito Hirobumi. But in 1948, he spoke to some press company and confirmed it was a lie. He referred to Ito Hirobumi as "My respected teacher".

He had a Wife, Lee Ju-yeol, and two sons. His first son Bak Munung was the succeeding mayor of Cheongdo, Cheongsong, Sangju, and Dalseong in North Gyeongsang Province in 1940s. His second son Bak Mu-ung died young.

His granddaughter and Bak Munung's daughter Bak Bu-nam (1931–2018) was a pediatrician and internist, she was a university professor at the College of Medicine of Kyungpook National University, Keimyung University. Also Lee Yeol-hye, husband of Bak Bu-nam. Lee Yeol-hye is a dentist and plastic surgeon, Lee was a university professor of College of Medicine of Kyungpook National University and nephew of poet Lee Sang-hwa and resistance activists Lee Sang-jeong, politician Lee Sang-baik.

Bak Jungyang had daughters with a Japanese concubine.

Pets 

He had a pet named Stick Mr. Bak(박작대기/박짝대기). The pet was named because Bak always carried a long stick, sometime called the "Enlightened Stick".

Other 
For decades, Bak regularly wrote in his diary every day, which was stored in 20 boxes. Bak's diary was captured when he was arrested by the Special Investigation Committee of Anti-National Activities. Even after being release Bak didn't get his diary back. Bak wrote a memoir "Sulhoe", copy paper of some diary and his memories.

Books 
 《Bak Jungyang's Diary》(박중양일기, 朴重陽日記)
 《Sulhoe》(술회, 述懷)
 《Sinnyeon sogam》(신년소감, 新年所感)
 《Pokdosa pyeonjip jaryo》(폭도사편집자료, 暴徒史編輯資料) (1907)

Gallery

See also 

 Korea under Japanese rule
 Ito Hirobumi
 Yun Chi-ho
 Seo Jae-pil
 Refrain club
 Yu Kil-chun
 Yun Chi-oh
 Russo-Japanese War
 Kim Ok-gyun
 Syngman Rhee
 Kim Ok-gyun
 Kim Kyu-sik

Notes

References 
 Bak Eungyung(1999), 일제하 조선인관료 연구, Seoul, Korea: Hakminsa.
 반민족문제연구소(1993), 친일파 99인 1, Seoul, Korea: Dolbegye. .
 Lim Jong-guk(1991), 실록 친일파, Seoul, Korea: Dolbegye. .
 민족경제연구소(1948), 친일파 군상, Seoul, Korea: 삼성출판사.
 일제말~해방~한국戰 잔혹사
 Jeong Jae-yong(2008), 빙이화 (상, 하), Seoul, Korea:Hansome media
 Daqinfo(2003), 부끄러운 문화 답사기, Seoul, Korea:Bookis

External links 

 Bak Jungyang 
 Bak Jungyang 
 Bak Jungyang  
 Bak Jungyang:Korea historical person information 
 大邱の近代化-朴重陽 
 日本帝國勅選貴族院議員一覽 
 "일제가 현대 조선 개신" 해방후에도 망발…친일파 박중양 i-Daegumail news 2010. 01.25 
 순종의 남행에는 친일파 뿐이었다 The Dailian News 2010.01.30 
 "순종 남행이 박중양의 정치적 입지 높여" The Dailian News 2010.01.30 
 친일중의 친일 ‘3·1운동 자제단’은 누구? The Hangyeolye 2010.03.01 

Joseon politicians
Korean politicians
South Korean Confucianists
South Korean translators
History of liberalism
People of the Russo-Japanese War
Korean scholars
Korean Confucianists
Japanese politicians
Korean collaborators with Imperial Japan
Korean philosophers
Interpreters
1874 births
1959 deaths
20th-century translators
Members of the House of Peers (Japan)
Officials of the Korean Empire